The West Deane Way is a footpath in the Taunton Deane area of Somerset, England.

It is a  circular walk in the Vale of Taunton Deane.

See also

 Long-distance footpaths in the UK
 List of local nature reserves in England

References 

Taunton Deane
Long-distance footpaths in England
Footpaths in Somerset